Beto Villa (Falfurrias, Texas, October 26, 1915 – 1986) was a Texan saxophonist and considered, alongside Isidro López, the father of the orquesta Tejana.

References

1915 births
1986 deaths
American musicians of Mexican descent